Chocolat is a 2016 French drama film directed by Roschdy Zem and starring Omar Sy and James Thiérrée.

Synopsis 
The clown Chocolat becomes, in 1886, the first black artist of the French scene.

Plot 
In 1897, a black man, the son of former Cuban slave, plays a small role as the cannibal Kananga in the modest circus Delvaux. George Foottit, a white clown, is asked by the director to bring up his routine. He gets the idea to have an act with Kananga; a white authoritarian clown and a black scapegoat named Chocolat.

They are well received and the word spreads through France, reaching Joseph Oller, director of the Nouveau Cirque. He asks Foottit and Chocolat to take their show to his Parisian establishment. The success is immediate, and Chocolat becomes the first famous black clown. The success stirs envy in his previous employer's wife. She denounces him for being in France illegally.

Chocolat is arrested and tortured by the police. "A negro always remains a negro," the police commander tells Chocolat when he releases him. While the humiliation in the circus act is staged for humorous effect, the racism Chocolat encounters in France grinds him down. Chocolat is both celebrated as a star and made into a racial caricature. This becomes strikingly apparent when the poster for the show depicts Chocolat as a black stereotype. Faced with the hypocrisy of French society, he gives himself up to gambling, drugs and women.
An attempt to end his clown duo to branch into the Shakesperean tragedy Othello ends with part of the audience booing the premiere.
At the end of his life, Chocolat falls into obscurity and dies of consumption.

Historical accuracy 
The film is only loosely based on the real life of Rafael Padilla, son of a slave from Cuba, a Spanish colony at the time.

References to other films

The film shows Foottit and Chocolat being filmed by Louis and Auguste Lumiére.
During the credits, the Lumiére film  featuring the real clowns is shown.

Cast 

 Omar Sy as Chocolat
 James Thiérrée as George Foottit
 Clotilde Hesme as Marie
 Olivier Gourmet as Joseph Oller
 Frédéric Pierrot as Monsieur Delvaux
 Noémie Lvovsky as Madame Delvaux
 Alice de Lencquesaing as Camille
 Alex Descas as Victor
 Olivier Rabourdin as Firmin Gémier
 Xavier Beauvois as Félix Potin
 Denis and Bruno Podalydès as Auguste and Louis Lumière
 Thibault de Montalembert as Jules Moy
 Héléna Soubeyrand as Régina Badet
 Christophe Fluder as Marval
 Antonin Maurel as Ortis
 Mick Holsbeke as Green

Reception 
Review aggregator Rotten Tomatoes reports a 100% approval rating based on 23 reviews, with a weighted average of 7/10. It grossed $15.2 million at the box office.

Awards

References

External links 
 

2016 films
2016 biographical drama films
French biographical drama films
2010s French-language films
Circus films
Films about racism
Films based on non-fiction books
Films set in Paris
Films directed by Roschdy Zem
Gaumont Film Company films
2016 drama films
Films about clowns
Articles containing video clips
2010s French films